National Tertiary Route 310, or just Route 310 (or ) is a National Road Route of Costa Rica, located in the San José province.

Description
In San José province the route covers Escazú canton (San Rafael district), Santa Ana canton (Santa Ana, Pozos districts).

References

Highways in Costa Rica